John Russell "Jackie" Bell (17 October 1939 – 1991) was an English footballer. He played for Newcastle United, Norwich City and Colchester United.

Career
Bell joined Newcastle United straight from school. He turned professional in 1957. He played as a wing-back for the club from 1956 until 1962, making 117 appearances and scoring 8 goals.

After playing for Newcastle United since 1957, Bell was transferred to Norwich City in July 1962 for £100,000. This transfer became the subject of a dispute on which the League management committee heard evidence. Norwich City alleged that Newcastle United had asked too high a transfer for a player they knew to be diabetic. Newcastle denied they had tricked Norwich City and their explanation was accepted. They returned half the transfer fee to Norwich.

While playing for Colchester United, Bell was found to be suffering from diabetes so retired on medical advice from League football, joining Gainford Town.

References

External links

1939 births
1991 deaths
English footballers
Association football midfielders
Newcastle United F.C. players
Norwich City F.C. players
Colchester United F.C. players